Josef Šusta was a Czech aquaculturist and is considered to be among the modern "fathers" of the practice. He is notable for having written the 1884 book "On Nutrition of the Carp and its Fishpond Associates", as well as, alongside Antonin Fric and Josef Kafka, revitalizing the aquaculture industry in the Třeboň Basin by increasing pond productivity.

Works
 Výživa kapra a jeho družiny rybničné, 1884
 Fünf Jahrhunderte der Teichwirtschaft zu Wittingau (Pět století rybničního hospodářství v Třeboni), 1889
 Hospodářsko-rybářská těžba v rybnících (1868)

References

Further reading
 Tomeš, Josef: Český biografický slovník XX. století. V Praze: Paseka 3 volumes ,  OCLC 43599240 p. 326.
 Jiroušek, Bohumil: Josef Šusta, nestor českého rybníkářství. Historický obzor, 1998, 9 (1/2)
 Křivánek, Jiří; Němec, Jan; Kopp, Jan: Rybníky v České republice. Praha: Consult, 2012. 303 pp.  pp. 159–162
 Šusta, Josef [junior]: Léta dětství a jinošství. Vzpomínky I. Melantrich, Praha 1947, particularly the chapter Můj otec (pp. 53–76)

External links
Rybářství Třeboň Hld. a.s.: Josef Šusta
iDNES.cz: Třeboňský kapr slaví osmdesát let. Otcem byl rybníkář Josef Šusta, by Marek Podhora, 4 September 2019

Pisciculturists
People from Benešov District
1835 births
1914 deaths